Chrysi  (literally means "Golden" in Greek) may refer to the following places:

Chrysi, the Ancient Greek naming for Indochina.
Chrysi (island), an uninhabited island near eastern Crete
Chrysi, Kastoria, a village in the municipal unit Arrenes, Kastoria regional unit
Chrysi, Pella, a village in the municipal unit Exaplatanos, Pella regional unit